The 1971 Sandown 250 was an endurance motor race open to Group E Series Production Touring Cars. The event was held at the Sandown circuit in Victoria, Australia on 12 September 1971 over 130 laps, approximately 250 miles (403 km). As a round  of the 1971 Australian Manufacturers' Championship, the race featured five classes based on Capacity Price Units with the CP Unit value for each model determined by multiplying the engine capacity of the vehicle in litres by its retail price in Australian dollars.

The race, which is recognised as the sixth "Sandown 500", was won by Colin Bond driving a Holden LC Torana GTR XU-1.

Results

Note: The above results list 36 of the 37 starters in the race.

Notes
 Attendance: 25,000
 Number of entries in Official Programme: 44
 Starters: 37
 Finishers: 25
 Pole position: Allan Moffat, 1 minute 21.4 seconds
 Race time of winning car: 3 hours 5 minutes 21.0 seconds

References

Further reading

 Holden, The official racing history, 1988, page 333

External links
 Images from the Sandown 250 Retrieved from www.flickr.com on 17 March 2009

Motorsport at Sandown
Sandown 250
Pre-Bathurst 500